The 1988 NCAA Division II football rankings are from the Associated Press. This is for the 1988 season. The preseason poll and the first two weeks had 10 entries. From the third week onward, the poll was switched to a "Top 20".

Legend

NCAA Division II Football Committee poll

Notes

References

Rankings
NCAA Division II football rankings